The Russian Aerospace Forces or Russian Air and Space Forces () comprise the air and space branches of the Armed Forces of the Russian Federation. Russia established the VKS as a new branch of its military on 1 August 2015 with the merging of the Russian Air Force (VVS) and the Russian Aerospace Defence Forces (VVKO), as recommended by the Ministry of Defence. The VKS has its headquarters in Moscow. Russia's Defense Minister Sergei Shoigu explained the merger as improving efficiency and logistical support.

Organisation

Sub-branches
According to Jane's Information Group, with the merging of the Russian Air Force and the Russian Aerospace Defense Forces, the new Russian Aerospace Forces consist of three sub-branches:
Air Force

Space Forces

Leadership

Order of Battle 
The Aerospace Forces are organised in air armies.

Air Forces High Command (Главное командование ВВС) (Moscow)

 Units directly subordinated to the High Command (Части центрального подчинения ВВС)
 operationally subordinated to the High Command:
Military Transport Aviation Command (Командование военно-транспортной авиации) (Moscow)
 Long-Range Aviation Command (Командование дальней авиации) (Moscow)
 operationally subordinated to the Western Military District:
6th Leningrad Red Banner Army of Air Forces and Air Defence (6-я Ленинградская Краснознамённая армия ВВС и ПВО) (Saint Petersburg)
 operationally subordinated to the Southern Military District:
4th Red Banner Army of Air Forces and Air Defence (4-я Краснознамённая армия ВВС и ПВО) (Rostov-on-Don)
 operationally subordinated to the Central Military District:
 14th Red Banner Army of Air Forces and Air Defence (14-я Краснознамённая армия ВВС и ПВО) (Yekaterinburg)
 operationally subordinated to the Eastern Military District:
 11th Red Banner Army of Air Forces and Air Defence (11-я Краснознамённая армия ВВС и ПВО) (Khabarovsk)
 operationally subordinated to the Northern Fleet Joint Strategic Command:
 45th Air and Air Defenсe Forces Army (45-я Армия ВВС и ПВО) (Severomorsk-2) - uniquely the aviation units of the 45th Army belong administratively to the Naval Aviation and the ground-based missile air defence units belong to the Air Forces air defence branch.

Air Defence and Anti-Ballistic Missile Defence Forces Command (Командование войск ПВО-ПРО) (Moscow)

 1st Order of Lenin Air Defence and Anti-Ballistic Missile Defence Army (Special Purpose) (1-я ордена Ленина армия противовоздушной и противоракетной обороны (особого назначения)) (Balashikha, Moscow Oblast) - air cover of the Moscow area. (:ru:1-я армия противовоздушной и противоракетной обороны особого назначения)
 4th Air Defence Division "Hero of the Soviet Union Lt.-Gen. B. P. Kirpikov" (4-я дивизия ПВО имени Героя Советского Союза генерал-лейтенанта Б.П. Кирпикова) (Dolgoprudny, Moscow Oblast) (armed with the S-300PM/PS and the S-400 missile systems)
 5th Air Defence Division (5-я дивизия ПВО) (Petrovskoe, Moscow Oblast) (armed with the S-300PM and the S-400 missile systems)
 9th Anti-Ballistic Missile Defence Division (9-я дивизия ПРО) (Sofrino, Moscow Oblast) (armed with the A-135 anti-ballistic missile system)

Space Forces Command (Командование космических войск) (Krasnoznamensk, Moscow Oblast)

 15th Aerospace Forces Army (Special Purpose) (15-я армия Воздушно-космических сил (особого назначения)) (Krasnoznamensk)
 1st State Test Cosmodrome of the Russian Federation Ministry of Defence "Plesetsk" (1-й Государственный испытательный космодром Министерства обороны Российской Федерации «Плесецк»)
 Space Forces Arsenal (Арсенал космических войск) (Znamenka-1 village, Tambov Oblast)

Ranks and rank insignia 

Officer ranks

Other ranks

See also
Russian Naval Aviation
Strategic Missile Forces
United States Department of the Air Force
United States Air Force
United States Space Force

References

External links

Russian Aerospace Forces official site (English)

Military of Russia

Russian military aviation
Space warfare
Military units and formations established in 2015
2015 establishments in Russia